Acutogordius is a genus of worms belonging to the family Gordiidae.

The species of this genus are found in Northern America, Malesia.

Species
IRMNG lists the following species:
 Acutogordius acuminatus de Miralles & de Villalobos, 1998
 Acutogordius americanus de Miralles & de Villalobos, 1998
 Acutogordius australiensis Spiridonov, 1984
 Acutogordius doriae (Camerano, 1890)
 Acutogordius feae Heinze, 1952
 Acutogordius incertus Heinze, 1952
 Acutogordius obesus (Camerano, 1895)
 Acutogordius olivetti Schmidt-Rhaesa & Piper, 2021
 Acutogordius protectus Schmidt-Rhaesa & Geraci, 2006
 Acutogordius sulawensis Schmidt-Rhaesa & Geraci, 2006
 Acutogordius taiwanensis Chiu, Huang, Wu & Shiao, 2017

References

Nematomorpha